Troodos is a community in the Limassol District of Cyprus. Troodos was established in 2015.

References

Communities in Limassol District